Highway 101 (AR 101, Ark. 101, and Hwy. 101) is a designation for two north–south state highways in north central Arkansas. A western route of  runs north from US Route 62/US Route 412 (US 62/US 412) to Missouri Route 101 at the Missouri state line. A second route of  begins at Hand Valley and runs north to US 62/US 412.

Route description

Norfork Lake to Missouri
Highway 101 begins at an overlap between US 62/US 412 east of Mountain Home near Lake Norfork. The route passes the Panther Bay Public Use Area, the Bidwell Point Use Area, and the Seward Point Public Use Area. Highway  continues north through the community of Gamaliel before crossing into Missouri where the roadway continues as Route 101. The average daily traffic counts from the Arkansas State Highway and Transportation Department (AHTD) for 2010 show that a maximum of about 2800 vehicles per day (VPD) use the northern portion of Highway 101, with the count dropping to around 1500 VPD for portions further south.

Hand Valley to US 62
Highway 101 begins at Marion County Route 664 at the unincorporated community of Hand Valley and runs north to Rea Valley. The route continues north to terminate at US 62/US 412 between Cotter and Flippin. Traffic counts from the AHTD in 2010 indicate that the average daily traffic volume on this segment of Highway 101 is about 1100 vehicles per day.

History

Highway 101 is one of the original 1926 state highways, running only from State Road 12 north through Gamaliel to Missouri. The portion from Hand Valley to US 62/US 412 was added before 1929 and ran along its current routing. Highway 12 was later replaced by US 62 and US 412 was added still later.

Major intersections

Marion County segment

Baxter County segment

See also

References

101
Transportation in Baxter County, Arkansas
Transportation in Marion County, Arkansas
U.S. Route 62